The non-marine molluscs of Ethiopia are a part of the molluscan fauna of Ethiopia (wildlife of Ethiopia). Ethiopia is an inland country, so there are no marine molluscs.

A number of species of non-marine molluscs are found in the wild in Ethiopia.

Freshwater gastropods 

Ampullariidae
 Pila speciosa

Thiaridae
 Cleopatra ferruginea
 Melanoides tuberculata (O. F. Müller, 1774)

Planorbidae
 Ancylus ashangiensis
 Ancylus regularis
 Biomphalaria barthi
 Bulinus abyssinicus (von Martens, 1866)
 Bulinus hexaploidus
 Bulinus octaploidus

Lymnaeidae
 Radix natalensis (Krauss, 1848)

Land gastropods

Freshwater bivalves

See also
Lists of molluscs of surrounding countries:
 List of non-marine molluscs of Sudan, Wildlife of Sudan
 List of non-marine molluscs of Djibouti, Wildlife of Djibouti
 List of non-marine molluscs of Eritrea, Wildlife of Eritrea
 List of non-marine molluscs of Somalia, Wildlife of Somalia
 List of non-marine molluscs of Kenya, Wildlife of Kenya

References

External links 
 Verdcourt B. (1985). "New taxa of Gulella L. Pfr. and Ptychotrema Mörch (Mollusca, Streptaxidae) from Eastern Africa". Journal of Conchology 32(1): 109–122. abstract.

Molluscs, Non marine

Mollucs
Ethiopia
Ethiopia